The Nadăș is a left tributary of the river Someșul Mic in Romania. It discharges into the Someșul Mic in Cluj-Napoca. The name in Hungarian means "reedy". The Romanian name derives from that.

References

Rivers of Romania
Rivers of Cluj County